Wilh. Wilhelmsen Holding ASA (WWH) is a Norwegian multinational maritime group, headquartered in Lysaker, Norway. The group employs more than 21,000 people and has operations in 75 nations. The Wilhelmsen group operates the largest maritime network in the world, with over 2200 locations worldwide.

The WW group was founded on 1 October 1861 in Tønsberg. The company's first vessel was the barque Mathilde in 1886. Halfdan Wilhelmsen was forward thinking and realised that steamboats were the future, therefore in 1887 he bought the vessel Talabot. It was only after they bought Talabot that the company started making profits. Thence, all their ships have been named, started with the letter "T", often leading to the same name given repeatedly to different ships over time. For example, there have been at least four ships named Talabot ranging from tankers to ro-ro vessels.

Since 1978 the main owners have been the siblings Cecilie Paus and Helen Juell, and their now deceased brothers Wilhelm Wilhelmsen and Finn Wilhelmsen. Their children, the fifth generation of the Wilhelmsen family, are Thomas Wilhelmsen, Olympia Paus, Pontine Paus, Cathrine Løvenskiold Wilhelmsen, Hedvig Juell, Maren Juell, Hannah Wilhelmsen, Monica Wilhelmsen and Julie Wilhelmsen.

History 

In 1861, the company was founded by (Morten) Wilhelm Wilhelmsen in the town of Tønsberg, Norway. During the next two decades, Wilhelmsen's fleet increased with an average of one ship per year and by 1886 Wilhelmsen was Tønsberg's largest shipowner.

In 1886, Wilhelmsen's eldest son, Halfdan Wilhelmsen joined the firm and was instrumental in the company's move from sail ships to its first steamship. In late 1887, the company acquired the 1,800-ton freighter, Talabot. The steamship was a profitable investment for the Wilhelmsens and the letter "T" became synonymous with the company's naming tradition for its vessels.

In 1890, Halfdan Wilhelmsen laid the basis of the company's core business - liner trades. In 1911 NAAL (The Norwegian Africa and Australia Line) was established.

A turning point in the expansion of the Roll-on/roll-off operations was the full acquisition in November 1995 of NAL (Norwegian America Line) and its 7 Car Carriers.
NAL also owned a 70% stake in NOSAC (Norwegian Specialised Autocarcarriers), already in partnership with Wilh. Wilhelmsen Line, that was owning the remaining 30% share. 
At that time, NAL was facing a cargo volume downturn and an overall profits reduction, that made register lower than expected financial results in 1994-1995.
However the NOSAC takeover was fundamental not only to increase the fleet of nearly further 20 Car Carrier vessels, but also to fully step into the Korean market, where the company was previously awarded Kia Motors contract to ship cars from South Korea to United States, from 1996 to 1998.

Wilhelmsen family
The company's owners, the Wilhelmsen family, are descended from Wilhelm Zachariassen Holst (ca. 1732–1807), who worked at Vallø saltverk. His great-grandson was shipping magnate (Morten) Wilhelm Wilhelmsen (1839–1910), the founder of Wilh. Wilhelmsen. He was the father of ship-owner Halfdan Wilhelmsen (1864–1923), factory owner Finn Wilhelmsen (1867–1951), ship-owner Wilhelm Wilhelmsen (1872–1955) and businessman Axel Wilhelmsen (1881–1957).

Halfdan Wilhelmsen was the father of Mistress of the Robes Else Werring (1905–89), married to ship-owner Niels Roth Heyerdahl Werring (1897–1990). Wilhelm Wilhelmsen (1872) was the father of ship-owner Tom Wilhelmsen (1911–78), who was the father of the owners of the Wilh. Wilhelmsen company: Morten Wilhelm Wilhelmsen (1937-2020), Cecilie Paus (born 1943) and Helen Juell (born 1947). Cecilie Paus is the mother of fashion designer Pontine Paus and of Olympia Paus, wife of Alexander Nix.

Current operations

Shipping 

WW conducts shipping activities and specialises in roll-on roll off cargo, especially for large project and awkward cargoes like train coaches, small aircraft and large industrial machinery. This is aided by the fact that their Ro-ro vessels have large ramps that can support up to 420 tonnes cargo weight at a time. Together with its partners (EUKOR and Wallenius Lines), the group controls some 160 car and roll-on/roll-off carriers operating in a global network of trades. Its customers include manufacturers of cars as well as construction and agricultural machinery. In the car carrier market, they are the third largest carrier tonnage wise after MOL and NYK Line. On an annual basis, WW's shipping companies transport 5 million cars and 12 million cubic metres of high and heavy and non-containerised cargoes.

The group both owns and charters vessels, which are deployed in the fleets operated by subsidiaries Wallenius Wilhelmsen Logistics, American Roll-on Roll-off Carrier, United European Car Carriers and EUKOR Car Carriers. This last, corresponding to the former Roll-on/roll-off division of Hyundai Merchant Marine, was jointly acquired for an 80% by Wilhelmsen and Wallenius Line in November 2002, once the European Commission officially cleared the purchase and consequent re-branding.

In June 2011, Wilh.

Logistics services 
In association with maritime transport, WW offers various types of logistics service on land – terminal and technical services, procurement of inland transport and supply chain management for vehicles. In addition to logistical services offered through WWL, the WW group has interests in South Korea's Glovis, Australia's Kaplan and the two US companies American Auto Logistics and American Logistics Network.

Maritime services 
Wilhelmsen's maritime service segment includes ships service, ship management, insurance services and other maritime services activities. The group offers services like agencies in many ports. They are one of the world's largest providers of third-party ship management services. The WW group provides full technical management, crewing and related services for all major vessel types, this also includes 50% of NorSea Wind. Furthermore, they sell marine products, marine chemicals, maritime logistics and ships agency. Additionally the group provides marine and non-marine insurance for internal and external clients.

Supply services 
The supply services segment includes NorSea Group, WilNor Governmental Services and other supply service activities. The WW group owns ~75,2% of NorSea Group which provides supply bases and logistics to the offshore industry. Moreover, WilNor Governmental Services (WGS) provides military logistics services in Norway and internationally. In 2018 WGS provided host nation support to both Allied and Norwegian forces during the NATO exercise "Trident Juncture 18". In collaboration with the Norwegian Armed Forces, WGS developed a web-based ordering system named HOBS (short for Host Nation Support Order and Billing System). This technological innovation eased the process of ordering before and during as well as billing after the exercise to both participating and hosting nations. Wilhelmsen owns 51% of the company directly, with the remaining 49% owned through NorSea Group.

Accidents and casualties 
During the early hours of 14 December 2002, MV Tricolor (ex Nosac Sun, built in 1987) was sailing from Zeebrugge, Belgium to Southampton, U.K., with a load of nearly 2871 brand new BMW, Volvo and SAAB automobiles. 
She collided in the English Channel with mv Kariba, a 1982 Bahamian-flagged container ship. Kariba was able to continue on, but Tricolor sank and required salvage by wreck cutting. No casualties occurred.

In between end of 2018 and beginning of 2019, at least two operated vessels (MV Thalatta and MV Morning Composer) heading towards Australian ports, were stopped by the Australian authorities being suspected to carry cargo contaminated by the presence of the Brown marmorated stink bug. The vessels faced serious delays, and were asked to leave Australia territorial waters after a long wait at anchorage, being finally denied to enter any port until new fumigation performed on all cargo.

List of current Wilhelmsen Lines ships

Ships gallery

See also
MV Tricolor
List of roll-on/roll-off vessel accidents
Wallenius Lines
Wallenius Wilhelmsen Logistics
American Roll-on Roll-off Carrier
EUKOR
United European Car Carriers

References

Notes

Bibliography

External links

Shipping companies of Norway
Car carrier shipping companies
Companies established in 1861
1861 establishments in Norway
Companies based in Tønsberg
Companies listed on the Oslo Stock Exchange
Ro-ro shipping companies

Companies based in Bærum
Wilhelmsen family
Multinational companies headquartered in Turkey